Relebogile Mokhuoane (born 8 December 1994) is a South African soccer player who plays as a midfielder for South African Premier Division side Cape Town City.

References

1994 births
Living people
South African soccer players
Association football midfielders
Free State Stars F.C. players
Cape Town City F.C. (2016) players
South African Premier Division players
National First Division players